Infusion refers to the process of extracting chemical compounds or flavors from plant material in a solvent by allowing the material to remain suspended in the solvent over time.

Infusion may also refer to:

 A medical treatment in which liquid substances are delivered through various routes of administration:
 Intravenous therapy,  the infusion of liquid substances directly into a vein for medical purposes
 Hypodermoclysis, also known as subcutaneous infusion
 Infusion (band), an Australian dance-music act
 Tea infuser, a device in which loose tea leaves are placed for brewing
 Infusion (roller coaster), a roller coaster at Pleasure Beach, Blackpool, UK